Conversion to Islam is accepting Islam as a religion or faith and rejecting any other religion or irreligion.

Requirements
Converting to Islam requires one to declare the shahādah, the Muslim profession of faith ("there is no god but Allah; Muhammad is the messenger of Allah"). In the Islamic religion, it is believed that everyone is Muslim at birth. In Islam, circumcision is considered a sunnah custom and is never mentioned in the Quran but in hadith or sunnah. The majority of clerical opinions holds that circumcision is not required upon entering the Muslim faith.

Islamic missionary activities 
Dawah is the act of inviting or calling people to embrace Islam. In Islamic theology, the purpose of da‘wah is to invite people, Muslims and non-Muslims, to understand the worship of God as expressed in the Qur'an and the sunnah of Muhammad and to inform them about Muhammad. Da'wah as the "Call towards God" is the means by which Muhammad began spreading the message of the Qur'an to mankind. After Muhammad, his followers and the Ummah (Muslim community) assumed responsibility for it. They convey the message of the Qur'an by providing information on why and how the Qur'an preaches monotheism. Muhammad saw Islam as the true religion and mission of all earlier prophets.  He believed that their call had been limited to their own people but that his was universal. His mission as the final prophet was to repeat to the whole world this call and invitation (dawa) to Islam.  Muhammad wrote to various non-Muslim rulers, inviting them to convert.

Conversion rate
Counting the number of converts to a religion is difficult, because some national censuses ask people about their religion, but they do not ask if they have converted to their present faith, and, in some countries, legal and social consequences make conversion difficult, such as the death sentence for leaving Islam in some Muslim countries. Statistical data on conversion to and from Islam are scarce. 

According to a study published in 2011 by Pew Research, what little information is available suggests that religious conversion has no net impact on the global Muslim population as the number of people who convert to Islam is roughly similar to those who leave Islam. According to another study published on 2015 by Pew research center, Islam is expected to experience a modest gain of 3 million adherents through religious conversion between 2010 and 2050, although this modest impact will make Islam, compared with other religions, the second largest religion in terms of net gains through religious conversion after religiously unaffiliated, which expected has the largest net gains through religious conversion.

According to The New York Times, an estimated 25% of American Muslims are converts.
In Britain, around 6,000 people convert to Islam per year and, according to a June 2000 article in the British Muslims Monthly Survey, the majority of new Muslim converts in Britain were women. According to The Huffington Post, "observers estimate that as many as 20,000 Americans convert to Islam annually."

According to Pew Research, the number of U.S. converts to Islam is roughly equal to the number of U.S. Muslims who leave the religion, unlike other religions, in which the number of those leaving is greater than the number of converts. 77% of new converts to Islam are from Christianity, whereas 19% were from non-religion.  Conversely, 55% of Muslims who left Islam became non-religious, and 22% converted to Christianity. Data from the General Social Survey in the United States show that 32 percent of those raised Muslim no longer embrace Islam in adulthood, and 18 percent hold no religious identification.

According to historian Geoffrey Blainey from the University of Melbourne, since the 1960s, there has been a substantial increase in the number of conversions from Islam to Christianity, mostly to the Evangelical and Pentecostal forms.
Many Muslims who convert to Christianity face social and governmental persecution.  According to 2015 Believers in Christ from a Muslim Background": A Global Census study published by Baylor University institute for studies of religion, an estimated 10.2 million Muslims have converted to Christianity based on global missionary data. Whereas, according to Guinness, approximately 12.5 million more people converted to Islam than people converted to Christianity between 1990 and 2000.

Despite this, Islam remains, on the global level, the second religion with the second largest number of net converts into the religion, with about 420,000 more people converting to Islam than leaving Islam between 2015 and 2020. This number being surpassed by the number of people (7,570,000) switching from "religious" to "unaffiliated".
In 2010, the Pew Forum found "that statistical data for Muslim conversions is scarce and as per their little available information, there is no substantial net gain or loss of Muslims due to religious conversion. It also stated that "the number of people who embrace Islam and the number of those who leave Islam are roughly equal. Thus, this report excludes religious conversion as a direct factor from the projection of Muslim population growth." People switching their religions will likely have no effect on the growth of the Muslim population, as the number of people who convert to Islam is roughly similar to those who leave Islam. Another study found that the number of people who will leave Islam is 9,400,000 and the number of converts to Islam is 12,620,000 so the net gain to Islam through conversion should be 3 million between 2010 and 2050, mostly from Sub Saharan Africa (2.9 million). 

According to a 2017 Pew Research Center survey, between 2010 and 2015 "an estimated 213 million babies were born to Muslim mothers and roughly 61 million Muslims died, meaning that the natural increase in the Muslim population – i.e., the number of births minus the number of deaths – was 152 million over this period", and it added small net gains through religious conversion into Islam (420,000). According to a 2017 Pew Research Center survey, by 2060 Muslims will remain the second world's largest religion; and if current trends continue, the number of Muslims will reach 2.9 billion (or 31.1%). 

It was reported in 2013 that around 5,000 British people convert to Islam every year, with most of them being women. According to an earlier 2001 census, surveys found that there was an increase of 60,000 conversions to Islam in the United Kingdom. Many converts to Islam said that they suffered from hostility from their families. According to a report by CNN, "Islam has drawn converts from all walks of life, most notably African-Americans". Studies estimated about 30,000 converting to Islam annually in the United States. According to The New York Times, an estimated 25% of American Muslims are converts, these converts are mostly African American. According to The Huffington Post, "observers estimate that as many as 20,000 Americans convert to Islam annually.", most of them are women and African-Americans. Experts say that conversions to Islam have doubled in the past 25 years in France, among the six million Muslims in France, about 100,000 are converts. On the other hand, according to Pew Research, the number of American converts to Islam is roughly equal to the number of American Muslims who leave Islam and this is unlike other religions in the United States where the number of those who leave these religions is greater than the number of those who convert to it, and most people who leave Islam become unaffiliated, according to same study ex-Muslims were more likely to be Christians compare to ex-Hindus or ex-Jews.

According to the religious forecast for 2050 by Pew Research Center, between 2010 and 2050 modest net gains through religious conversion are expected for Muslims (3 million) and most of the net gains through religious conversion for Muslims found in the Sub Saharan Africa (2.9 million). 

Darren E. Sherkat questioned in Foreign Affairs whether some of the Muslim growth projections are accurate as they do not take into account the increasing number of non-religious Muslims. Quantitative research is lacking, but he believes the European trend mirrors the American: data from the General Social Survey in the United States show that 32 percent of those raised Muslim no longer embrace Islam in adulthood, and 18 percent hold no religious identification. Many Muslims who leave Islam face social rejection or imprisonment and sometimes murder or other penalties.  According to Harvard University professor Robert D. Putnam, there is increasing numbers of Americans who are leaving their faith and becoming unaffiliated and the average Iranian American is slightly less religious than the average American. According to Public Affairs Alliance of Iranian Americans, the number of Iranian Americans Muslims decreased from 42% in 2008 to 31% in 2012 according to a telephone survey around the Los Angeles region. A June 2020 online survey found a much smaller percentage of Iranians stating they believe in Islam, with half of those surveyed indicating they had lost their religious faith. The poll, conducted by the Netherlands-based GAMAAN (Group for Analyzing and Measuring Attitudes in Iran), using online polling to provide greater anonymity for respondents, surveyed 50,000 Iranians and found 32% identified as Shia, 5% as Sunni and 3% as Sufi Muslim. A survey conducted by Pew Research Center in 2017 found that conversion has a negative impact on the growth of the Muslim population in Europe, with roughly 160,000 more people leaving Islam than converting into Islam between 2010 and 2016. According to a religious forecast for 2050 by Pew Research Center conversion does not add significantly to the growth of the Muslim population in Europe, according to the same study the net loss is (−60,000) due to religious switching.

See also
 Islamic missionary activity
 Spread of Islam
 Al-Baqara 256
 List of converts to Islam
 Conversion to Islam in prisons
 Muslim population growth

Notes

References

Conversion to Islam